Thaaiku Oru Thaalaattu is a 1986 Indian Tamil-language drama film, directed by Balachandra Menon and produced by K. R. Gangadharan. The film stars Sivaji Ganesan, Padmini, Visu and Pandiarajan. It was released on 16 July 1986. The film was a remake of the director's own Malayalam film Oru Painkilikatha.

Plot 
Rich industrialist Rajasekar (Sivaji Ganesan) is a loving husband to Dhanam (Padmini) and father to three children. Their oldest son, Ravi, is a Collector and married to, Rajyalakshmi, a successful managing director of a company. Their youngest, Manju (Ilavarasi), is a brilliant college student aiming to become a doctor. Their middle child is the unambitious Kannan (Pandiarajan) who couldn't succeed academically and is now working as a labourer in his father's factory. Rajasekar, though he loves his son, is also bitterly disappointed in Kannan and keeps him at an emotional distance. He hopes by withholding affection, he can spur Kannan into becoming more ambitious and successful in life. Dhanam, on the other hand, appreciates that Kannan is kind, funny and considerate of others. She showers him with affection and tries to bridge the divide between father and son. Kannan learns that Manju is in love with fellow college student Ramesh (Pandiyan) and is supportive. When Rajasekar arranges Manju's marriage to Kumar (Vijayakumar), Kannan objects. However, Manju is too intimidated to go against her strict father and sacrifices her love to marry Kumar. Kannan's own love affair with the maid, Chellakili (Rohini) comes to light when she becomes pregnant. Unlike Manju, Kannan chooses love despite his father's displeasure at his actions. He and Chellakili marry and move out with the help of family friend, Ponnambalam (Visu).

Although he left the family home, Kannan is still desperate for his father's love and approval. Pakkiri (Vijay Krishnaraj (alias) R Krishnan), a fellow worker at the factory who's looking to stir up trouble, senses Kannan's desperation and convinces him to join the union. Father and son clash when the workers agitate for better conditions. Padmavathi (Sujatha), a labour relations officer, is called in to mediate. Rajasekar is perturbed as he once knew Padmavathi before his marriage. Padmavathi grows closer to Kannan and Chellakili as Rajasekar continues to take a strict stand with his son. A family tragedy brings matters to a head, forcing Rajasekar to re-evaluate his priorities.

Cast 
Sivaji Ganesan as Rajasekar
Padmini as Dhanam
Sujatha as Padmavathi
Pandiarajan as Kannan
Rohini as Chellakili
Visu as Ponnambalam
Vijay Krishnaraj as Pakkiri
Ilavarasi as Manju
Vijayakumar as Kumar
Pandiyan as Ramesh
Nizhalgal Ravi
Rajyalakshmi

Soundtrack 
The music was composed by Ilaiyaraaja, with lyrics by Vairamuthu.

Reception 
Jayamanmadhan of Kalki felt the film starts without a goal and continues without a goal. The climax also ends tamely.

References

External links 
 

1980s Tamil-language films
1986 drama films
1986 films
Films directed by Balachandra Menon
Films scored by Ilaiyaraaja
Indian drama films
Tamil remakes of Malayalam films